Akasya is a shopping mall and mixed-use development in Üsküdar, Istanbul, Turkey. The mall has a gross leasable area of 80,000 sqm and was developed on the site of a former car factory by SAF REIT in Acıbadem, a participation of Akiş REIT. The complex contains 1,357 residences as well as the shopping center, with around 250 stores including a hypermarket. The mall opened on March 6, 2014. Stores include department stores Beymen, Boyner and Vakkorama.

References

Shopping malls in Istanbul